Grégory Rouchon (born 24 September 1983, in Saint-Germain-en-Laye) is a retired French professional footballer, who played as a defender.

Rouchon played at the professional level in Ligue 2 for FC Rouen.

References

External links
 

1983 births
Living people
Sportspeople from Saint-Germain-en-Laye
Association football defenders
French footballers
Ligue 2 players
FC Rouen players
US Sénart-Moissy players
SC Toulon players
Pacy Ménilles RC players
AS Moulins players
Footballers from Yvelines